Retro-Future Vagabond is the second compilation album by steampunk band Abney Park, published exclusively on vinyl only by German vinyl label soundsUP records.  The album was released on May 1, 2014 and was limited to 500 copies worldwide. All the songs were mastered for the vinyl from the source material by Andreas Kauffelt at Schnittstelle Studios (Frankfurt).

Artwork
The artwork for the album was created by "Captain" Robert and features a stylized old LP cover.

Track selection
After several polls on his official Facebook page, the track list has been selected by "Captain" Robert.

Track listing
Side one
"Airship Pirate" – 4:00
"Scupper Shanty" – 2:56
"Follow Me If You Want To Live" – 3:23
"Sleep Isabella" – 4:27
"Not Silent" – 4:06

Side two
"Off The Grid" – 2:37
"The Story That Never Starts" – 4:07
"Until The Day You Die" – 2:46
"The Anthropophagists' Club" – 3:38
"Chronofax (Letter Between A Little Boy & Himself As An Adult)" – 4:19

Personnel

Regular band members 
 "Captain" Robert Brown - songs, singing, bouzouki, harmonica, accordion, darbuka
 Kristina Erickson - keyboards, piano
 Nathaniel Johnstone - violin, guitar, banjo, mandolin
 Daniel Cederman - bass
 Jody Ellen - voice

Guest artists 
 Richard Lopez - trombone, alto flute
 Carey Rayburn - vintage muted trumpet
 Erica "Unwoman" Mulkey - cello

References

2014 albums
Abney Park (band) albums